The croat was a silver coin of Catalonia introduced by Peter III of Aragon in 1285 and minted at Barcelona. The term "croat" derives from the Latin grossus denarius, great coin, a common term for silver coins of higher value than pennies. Peter III was inspired by the gros introduced by Louis IX of France.

The croat was originally worth twelve terns of 25% silver billon. In 1340 the gold florín was introduced at a value of eleven croats. The purity of the florín was fixed at eighteen carats (75% gold) in 1365. As the popularity of the florín and the croat grew, the Aragonese empire settled into bimetallism. The Catalan croat was equivalent in value to the Aragonese ral (which went by many names: grosso, real, alfonsino, anfusinus). It was the most stable of all the Aragonese coinage and widely used in the Mediterranean trade.

Notes

Sources

Coins
History of Catalonia